The Freedom Union–Democratic Union (US–DEU) was a small pro-European liberal party in the Czech Republic from 1998 to 2011.

Freedom Union was founded in January 1998 by former members of the Civic Democratic Party who were unhappy with the leadership of Václav Klaus. After initially serving in a caretaker government, Freedom Union went into opposition after the 1998 election. In opposition Freedom Union merged with the Democratic Union party and formed an alliance with the Christian Democratic Union – Czechoslovak People's Party.

From 2002 to 2006 Freedom Union was part of a coalition government with the Social Democratic Party and the Christian Democratic Union. However, in government the party lost support and at the 2006 election the party won less than 1% of the vote and failed to win any seats. The party ceased to exist on 1 January 2011.

History

Founding
The party was founded on 17 January 1998 at a congress in Litomyšl as Freedom Union, as a split from the Civic Democratic Party. The party was founded after divisions within the Civic Democratic Party over the leadership of Václav Klaus and what the defectors said was his failure to tackle funding scandals. The former interior minister Jan Ruml led a challenge for the leadership of the Civic Democrats, but was defeated by Klaus by 227 votes to 72 at a special congress on 14 December 1997. Afterwards 30 Members of Parliament formed Freedom Union, with these including the finance minister Ivan Pilip and the defence minister Michal Lobkowicz. The party elected Jan Ruml as the first leader of the party on 2 February 1998.

Both Ivan Pilip and Michal Lobkowicz were among the  members of the Freedom Union who remained in the caretaker government of Josef Tošovský, which had been formed after the collapse of the coalition led by Václav Klaus. The party initially did well in the polls, with a poll in March 1998 showing Freedom Union on 13%, ahead of the Civic Democrats who were on 8%. However the party suffered in the campaign for the June 1998 election, due to a lack of readiness for an election and a vague programme that was seen as being very similar to the Civic Democrats.

Opposition
At the 1998 election the Freedom Union won 8.6% of the vote and 19 seats in the Chamber of Deputies. The party went into opposition as they would not govern with a Civic Democratic Party led by Václav Klaus and would not form a coalition with the Social Democratic Party as their policies were so different. Instead the Social Democrats formed a minority government, which was tolerated by the Civic Democrats.

In September 1998 Freedom Union formed an alliance with 3 other centre-right parties, the Christian Democratic Union – Czechoslovak People's Party, Democratic Union and the Civic Democratic Alliance, with the alliance being called the "Four-Coalition". The Four Coalition went on to win the most seats at the November 1998 Senate election. Jan Ruml resigned as leader in December 1999 and the following February the party elected Karel Kühnl as the new leader after receiving 193 votes compared to 87 for Vladimír Mlynář.

Freedom Union had a strong performance at the November 2000 Senate election, becoming the third largest party in the Senate and in late 2001 Freedom Union merged with the Democratic Union party to form the Freedom Union-Democratic Union (US-DEU). However the Four Coalition ended at the beginning of 2002, after the level of debt held by the Civic Democratic Alliance emerged and they were unable to agree on dealing with it. Freedom Union-Democratic Union instead then formed an alliance just with the Christian Democratic Union – Czechoslovak People's Party to fight the 2002 election as the "Coalition".

Government
At the 2002 election the coalition between Freedom Union-Democratic Union and the Christian Democrats won 31 seats in the Chamber of Deputies. Following the election Freedom Union-Democratic Union and the Christian Democrats became part of a coalition government led by the Czech Social Democratic Party, which together held a one-seat majority. However at the 2002 Senate election Freedom Union-Democratic Union was reduced to only one senator.

As a part of government, the party started to lose members and support. Freedom Union-Democratic Union suffered defeat in the 2004 European Parliamentary elections, failing to pass the 5% threshold required to win seats, with the party leader Petr Mares resigning as a result and being succeeded by the Regional Development Minister Pavel Němec. The party would then win just one seat at the 2004 Senate election.

Decline and dissolution
At the 2006 election it received just 0.3% of votes cast and lost all its seats in the Chamber of Deputies, which led to the resignation of its leader, Pavel Němec.

The party held a final party conference on 4 December 2010, where the decision was made that it should cease to exist as of 1 January 2011.

Policies
Freedom Union-Democratic Union was a centre-right liberal party. It believed in free market policies and supported lower taxes and university tuition fees. Freedom Union-Democratic Union also had a consistent party message of the fight against corruption.

However the party was also socially liberal, believing in the protection of the environment and minority rights. For the 2006 election the party would support euthanasia, same-sex marriage and the legalisation of marijuana. The party was also pro-European and supported direct presidential elections.

These policies meant that the party was able to get support from younger urban voters and those with higher education.

Election results

Chamber of deputies of the Czech Republic

Senate

Presidential

European Parliament

Leaders

References

External links
Freedom Union–Democratic Union official site

 
Liberal parties in the Czech Republic
Defunct political parties in the Czech Republic
Right-wing parties in the Czech Republic
Civic Democratic Party (Czech Republic) breakaway groups
Social liberal parties
Liberal conservative parties in the Czech Republic
2011 disestablishments in the Czech Republic
1998 establishments in the Czech Republic
Political parties established in 1998
Political parties disestablished in 2011